Border Lakes Ojibwe is a dialect of the Ojibwe language spoken in the Lake of the Woods area of Ontario at the intersection of the borders of Ontario, Minnesota, and Manitoba. Communities in the Border Lakes dialect area have sometimes been treated as a part of the Western Ojibwe (Saulteaux) dialect, but dialect survey research conducted in the 1980s and 1990s analyses it as a separate dialect closely related to Saulteaux Ojibwe.

Communities identified as Border Lakes include Lac La Croix, Emo (Rainy River First Nation), and Whitefish Bay, all in Ontario.

Border Lakes Ojibwe is not listed in Ethnologue.

Notes

References

 Gordon Jr., Raymond G., ed., 2005. Ethnologue: Languages of the World, 15th edition. Ethnologue: Languages of the World Dallas: Summer Institute of Linguistics.  
 Rhodes, Richard and Evelyn Todd. 1981. "Subarctic Algonquian languages." June Helm, ed., The Handbook of North American Indians, Volume 6. Subarctic, 52-66. Washington, D.C.: The Smithsonian Institution. 
 Valentine, J. Randolph, 1994. Ojibwe dialect relationships. PhD dissertation, University of Texas, Austin.

Central Algonquian languages
Ojibwa language, Central
Indigenous languages of the North American eastern woodlands
First Nations languages in Canada